Disneymania 7 is the seventh and final installment in the Disneymania series. It features a variety of contemporary performers performing Disney songs. Disneymania 7 was released on March 9, 2010.

Track listing

Singles
 Demi Lovato - "Gift of a Friend" (Tinker Bell and the Lost Treasure)
 Drew Seeley - "Her Voice" (Little Mermaid on Broadway)

Music videos
 Demi Lovato - "Gift of a Friend" (Tinker Bell and the Lost Treasure)
 Drew Seeley - "Her Voice" (Little Mermaid on Broadway)

Chart performance

References

Disneymania albums
Walt Disney Records compilation albums
2010 compilation albums